Iskudar is a village in the Togdheer region of Somaliland. The closest airport is the Berbera Airport which is distanced 55 km from Iskudar.

See also

References 

Populated places in Togdheer